"Friends, Romans, countrymen, lend me your ears" is the first line of a speech by Mark Antony in the play Julius Caesar, by William Shakespeare. Occurring in Act III, scene II, it is one of the most famous lines in all of Shakespeare's works.

Summary  

Antony has been allowed by Brutus and the other conspirators to make a funeral oration for Caesar on condition that he will not blame them for Caesar's death; however, while Antony's speech outwardly begins by justifying the actions of Brutus and the assassins, Antony uses rhetoric and genuine reminders to ultimately portray Caesar in such a positive light that the crowd is enraged against the conspirators.

Throughout his speech, Antony calls the conspirators "honourable men"  his implied sarcasm becoming increasingly obvious. He begins by carefully rebutting the notion that his friend, Caesar, deserved to die because he was ambitious, instead claiming that his actions were for the good of the Roman people, whom he cared for deeply ("When that the poor have cried, Caesar hath wept: / Ambition should be made of sterner stuff"). He denies that Caesar wanted to make himself king, for there were many who witnessed the latter's denying the crown three times.

As Antony reflects on Caesar's death and the injustice that nobody will be blamed for it, he becomes overwhelmed with emotion and deliberately pauses ("My heart is in the coffin there with Caesar, / And I must pause till it come back to me"). As he does this, the crowd begins to turn against the conspirators.

Antony then teases the crowd with Caesar's will, which they beg him to read, but he refuses. Antony tells the crowd to "have patience" and expresses his feeling that he will "wrong the honourable men / Whose daggers have stabb'd Caesar" if he is to read the will. The crowd, increasingly agitated, calls the conspirators "traitors" and demands that Antony read out the will.

Instead of reading the will immediately, however, he focuses the crowd's attention on Caesar's body, pointing out his wounds and stressing the conspirators' betrayal of a man who trusted them, in particular the betrayal of Brutus ("Judge, O you gods, how dearly Caesar loved him!"). In response to the passion of the crowd, Antony denies that he is trying to agitate them ("I come not, friends, to steal away your hearts"), and he contrasts Brutus, "an orator", with himself, "a plain, blunt man", implying that Brutus has manipulated them through deceitful rhetoric. He claims that if he were as eloquent as Brutus, he could give a voice to each of Caesar's wounds ("... that should move / The stones of Rome to rise and mutiny").

After that, Antony deals his final blow by revealing Caesar's will, in which "To every Roman citizen he gives, / To every several man, seventy-five drachmas" as well as land, to the crowd. He ends his speech with a dramatic flourish: "Here was a Caesar, when comes such another?", at which point the crowd begins to riot and search out the assassins with the intention of killing them.

Antony then utters to himself: "Now let it work. Mischief, thou art afoot, / Take thou what course thou wilt!"

As an icon of rhetoric 

The speech is  a famous example of the use of emotionally charged rhetoric. Comparisons have been drawn between this  speech and political speeches throughout history in terms of the rhetorical devices employed to win over a crowd.

Parody 

In Monty Python's Life of Brian, the first line is quoted by Michael Palin as Pontius Pilate. In Carry On Cleo (1964), the line is begun several times by Julius Caesar, played by actor Kenneth Williams.

In the 1971 film, Up Pompeii, Michael Hordern, playing Ludicrus Sextus, is given the line: "Friends, Romans, countrymen, lend me your feet".

Lord Buckley recast the speech as "Hipsters, flipsters and finger-poppin' daddies: knock me your lobes."

Also parodied in Ace Ventura: When Nature Calls (1995), when Ace Ventura (Jim Carrey) is rallying his animals, he yells "Friends!  Rodents!  Quadrupeds!  Lend me your rears!" Also parodied in Sausage Party, when Frank (Seth Rogen) tries to convince the other food that the humans are evil he starts by saying "Friends, Ramen, Country Club Lemonade, lend me your ears of corn."

In An American Tail: Fievel Goes West (1991), Cat R. Waul (John Cleese) begins the opening ceremony of his saloon (while using a concealed giant mouse trap to trap the mice) with the line: "Cats and gentle-mice, lend me your ears!"

In Robin Hood: Men in Tights (1993) the speech is parodied where Robin Hood begins the speech, only to be interrupted by a  barrage of ears thrown by the audience, misinterpreting the rhetoric for a literal request.

In René Goscinny and Albert Uderzo’s Astérix comics, the line is parodied several times, most often by the Chief Vitalstatistix, as “Friends, Gauls, countrymen,” which is normally the beginning of the chief’s speeches. These speeches, to his immense annoyance, are invariably interrupted by the villagers.

In popular media
The lyrics of Bob Dylan's "Pay in Blood" on his 2012 album Tempest include the line, "I came to bury not to praise."

In episode 18 of season 3 ("Enemies Foreign and Domestic") of the TV show The West Wing, the White House Press Secretary lists the injustices to women perpetrated by US ally Saudi Arabia and follows this with "But Brutus is an honorable man."

The video game Duke Nukem: Time to Kill has the titular Duke parody the line upon entering Ancient Rome. The line goes "Friends, Romans, countrymen, lend me your chicks."

The line is referenced in the Ernest P. Worrell movie Ernest Scared Stupid. During a scene where Ernest tries to help give advice to his young friend Kenny after he gets bullied while looking for a place to build a tree house, Ernest recounts a fictional story of Botswana rebelling against the Ottoman Empire, wherein he portrays a Julius Caesar-like figure and at one point recites a paraphrased version of the line; "Friends, Romans, Botswanians, lend me your trees!" 

In The Great Vacation by Dirt Poor Robins the line "romans and countrymen" is used as well.

References

External links 

 Julius Caesar, Act 3, Scene 2, Line 73.

Literature of England
Julius Caesar (play)
Shakespearean phrases
Speeches
16th-century neologisms